Ashmore Park is a large housing estate in Wednesfield, England. It has been part of the city of Wolverhampton, West Midlands since 1966, when the majority of Wednesfield was incorporated into Wolverhampton. It constitutes mostly of the Wednesfield North ward of the Wolverhampton council.

History
Ashmore Park was initially one of the wooded estates Lady Wulfruna transferred to St. Peter's Fold to allow the park to generate income and food. A moat-surrounded farmhouse was built here sometime during the mid-14th century. Three-quarters of the moat still exists today in the "bottom shops" precinct.

The housing estate, built as an overspill estate for Wolverhampton, was constructed within the Wednesfield Urban District. The estate consists predominantly of council houses, flats, and bungalows from the 1950s.

The Dean of Wolverhampton probably used the homestead in his role as Dean (landlord) of Ashmore Park. The original farmhouse was removed when a new one was built in the early 19th century. In 1957 authorities demolished that farmhouse and built a library near its site.

Demographics
According to the 2001 United Kingdom census, Ashmore Park had a total population of 6,734. Of these, 27.6% of its residents were between the ages of 25–44 years old, while 24.3% reported being between the ages of 60-74. The neighbourhood is not ethnically diverse, with 97.4% of its residents classified as Caucasian; the largest ethnic minority group is Black Caribbean, representing just 0.9% of the population.

54.5% of the 2,968 households in the neighbourhood were owner-occupied, while 39.4% of homes were council houses. Ashmore Park had an unemployment rate of 7.1%, ranking above the Wolverhampton average of 5.3%. Of those identified as economically inactive, 24.4% were retired. And of all households in the neighbourhood, only 11.1% were not considered deprived at all, while 7.2% were overcrowded.

Christianity is the area's predominant religion, with 81.6% of the population identifying as Christian. 9.4% of residents reported that they did not have a religious affinity.

Education
At the time of construction, Ashmore Park was served by two schools: Ashmore Park County Primary School and Danesfield Primary School (later Danesmore) . Both have since been demolished.

Today a secondary school, Coppice Performing Arts School, serves the estate, with three primary schools: Oak Meadow Primary School, Corpus Christi Catholic School, and St. Alban's Primary School.

Places of interest

At the heart of the estate is a large green park consisting of a children's play area and several sports facilities, including a skate park, multi-sports pitch, BMX track, and bowling green. The park is also home to the Wednesfield Aces and Wednesfield Dragons cycle speedway teams. The park was built on top of a slag heap left over from mining activity in the area.

There are two main shopping areas, known locally as the "top" and "bottom" shops due to their geographic location. The "bottom shop" precinct houses a mix of local and independent businesses and underwent an extensive facelift during the early 2000s that included work to preserve the historic moat site.

In 2014 a revamped community centre opened called The Hub at Ashmore Park with many facilities for the local community to use. The library which was located next to the "bottom shops" shopping precinct was closed and merged into the hub, whilst many other libraries were closed or had reduced opening hours in Wolverhampton.

There are two public houses and a social club on the estate: The True Briton, The Ashmore Inn and Corpus Christi Social Club.

In 2014 more than 350 members of the local community signed a petition to save The Ashmore Inn public house from being closed and turned into a retail store. The petition succeeded in having The Ashmore Inn listed as an Asset of Community Value. In 2016 a Coop Food convenience store and Tanning Salon were opened on adjacent land sharing the car park with the public house, whilst the bookmakers previously there moved to the "bottom shops" shopping precinct.

Transport

Trains
Ashmore Park is served by West Midland Trains that run approximately on an hourly basis. The nearest train stations to Ashmore Park are Bloxwich North, Bloxwich, and Wolverhampton. There was a railway station named “Linthouse Crossway” on the west side of the estate, until 1890. There is nothing left of the old station, as the site is now part of wheat fields.

Buses
Several bus services serve Ashmore Park, including the 57, 59, and 69 lines.

The 59 bus, which is operated by National Express West Midlands, runs the most frequent service. It provides regular access to the estate from Wolverhampton via Heath Town, New Cross Hospital and Wednesfield roughly every six minutes during the day (Monday-Saturday) and every 12 minutes in the evenings, on Sundays, and bank holidays.

The 69 bus, also operated by National Express West Midlands, provides service to the lower zone of the estate between Wolverhampton and Walsall via Heath Town, New Cross Hospital, Wood End, Coppice Farm, New Invention, Beechdale, and Reedswood Retail Park. This service operates every 30 minutes during the day (Monday-Saturday) and hourly during the day on Sunday.

Similar to the 69 bus the 57 bus service, operated by Diamond West Midlands (Rotala), serves the lower zone of the estate. It runs from Wolverhampton to Bilston via Heath Town, Park Village, Wednesfield, Wood End, Lyndale Park, and Willenhall. Hourly service operates during the daytime, Monday-Saturday.

References

External links 
WV11.co.uk - A local community news and events resource
- Wolverhampton Police on Ashmore Park
- The Hub at Ashmore Park, Library, Community & Youth Centre

Areas of Wolverhampton